Snow Lake is a town in Manitoba, Canada, located 685 km north of Winnipeg at the end of Provincial Road 392. The main industry is, and always has been, mining; currently with one mine producing Zinc, and another lithium. The official Town of Snow Lake is a very large, overwhelmingly rural area that is centered about the urban community of Snow Lake, which lies very near its geographical center. The Town is as large in area as a typical rural municipality in the more southern parts of Manitoba.

Possibly named for a local family (Rudnyckyj) or because early settlers "found the water in the lake as soft as the melted snow" (Files, Manitoba Department of Natural Resources).

Mining 
Mining always has been Snow Lake's major industry. Two separate mining ventures have operated in the community over the past 40 years.  TVX/Kinross/High River operated the New Britannia Mine, which closed in January 2005, and HudBay Minerals, which operated 12 area mines.  They were/are Lalor Mine, Chisel Lake, Stall Lake, Osborne Lake, Dickstone, Anderson Lake, Ghost Lake, Lost Lake, Spruce Point, Rod Mine, Photo Lake, and Chisel North.

Following a rise in demand, lithium has begun to attract mining companies to the area. Nasdaq listed Snow Lake Lithium ($LITM) are currently (at Jan 2022) preparing to start commercial lithium mining.

Tourism 
Nature lovers will delight in the numerous species of birds, animals and vegetation found along the region's many area hiking trails. Picking strawberries, raspberries, blueberries, or gooseberries is also a favourite summer pastime. History enthusiasts can explore ancient Aboriginal pictographs that are approximately 1500 years old.

Fishing and boating are popular activities with the presence of many lakes and rivers, such as Snow Lake, Wekusko Lake and the Grass River that have abundances of northern pike, walleye, and perch. The Grass River Route will provide outdoor enthusiasts with an insight into the life of the early voyageurs and fur traders.

In the winter months, local hiking paths double as cross-country ski trails, while miles of frozen lakes and rivers in the area provide endless trails for snowmobilers. Ice fishing is popular as well.

The town of Snow Lake also is home to a hockey arena, curling rink, 9-hole golf course and several other recreational facilities which play host to a number of activities and tournaments over the course of the year.

On September 22, 2014 MTS launched 4G HSPA telephone service in the community and surrounding area.

Demographics

Education 
Joseph H. Kerr School, the lone educational facility in Snow Lake, is a Kindergarten to Senior Four facility with an enrollment of 145 students for the 2008 - 2009 school year. It is now part of the Frontier School Division.  Prior to a Provincial amalgamation (2003) of school districts, it operated under its own district, the School District of Snow Lake # 2309.  The building, under one form or another, has been open for close to 50 years.  In 2001, Joseph H. Kerr was named one of the 30 most innovative schools by Canada's Schoolnet.

Local media and services

Radio
 NCI - 96.3
 CBC - 95.5

Television

CBWKT connected to the province-wide microwave system on March 1, 1969.

 Shaw Cable Television;
 CBWKT channel 8 (CBC);
 CKYS-TV channel 11 (CTV).

References

External links
Town of Snow Lake web site

Mining communities in Manitoba
Towns in Manitoba